The office of Deputy Leader of the Scottish Labour Party was established in 2000 under the leadership of Donald Dewar. Since the Murphy and Boyack review in 2011, the office has open up to all elected Scottish Labour politicians, including members of the Scottish Parliament, the Parliament of the United Kingdom and local government in Scotland. During leadership elections, the incumbent deputy leader becomes acting Leader of the Scottish Labour Party.

List

References

Scottish Labour